Pady  is a village in Kasaragod district in the state of Kerala, India.

Demographics
 India census Pady had a population of 6640 with 3309 males and 3331 females.
The common income of Pady is agriculture which includes Rice, coconut, areca nut etc.
Pady is found of Theyyam is a popular Hindu ritual form of worship.
Pady is having mainly two temples named as Kailar (Shiva temple) temple and bellur (Vishnu temple) temple. Having More than Ten Vayanattu Kulavan Tharavadu also, Kaliyattam is the biggest celebration in Pady which is celebrated once in a year in January. Pady is separated by a river called madhuvahini river as Akkara and Ekkara.once in a year farmers of pady created check dam for agricultural purposes.the village pady have a kavu, famous for Chamundi theyyam.womens are not allowed to saw the chammundi Theyyam in pady.

References

Suburbs of Kasaragod